= Lady Slipper Brook =

Watercourse in Canada

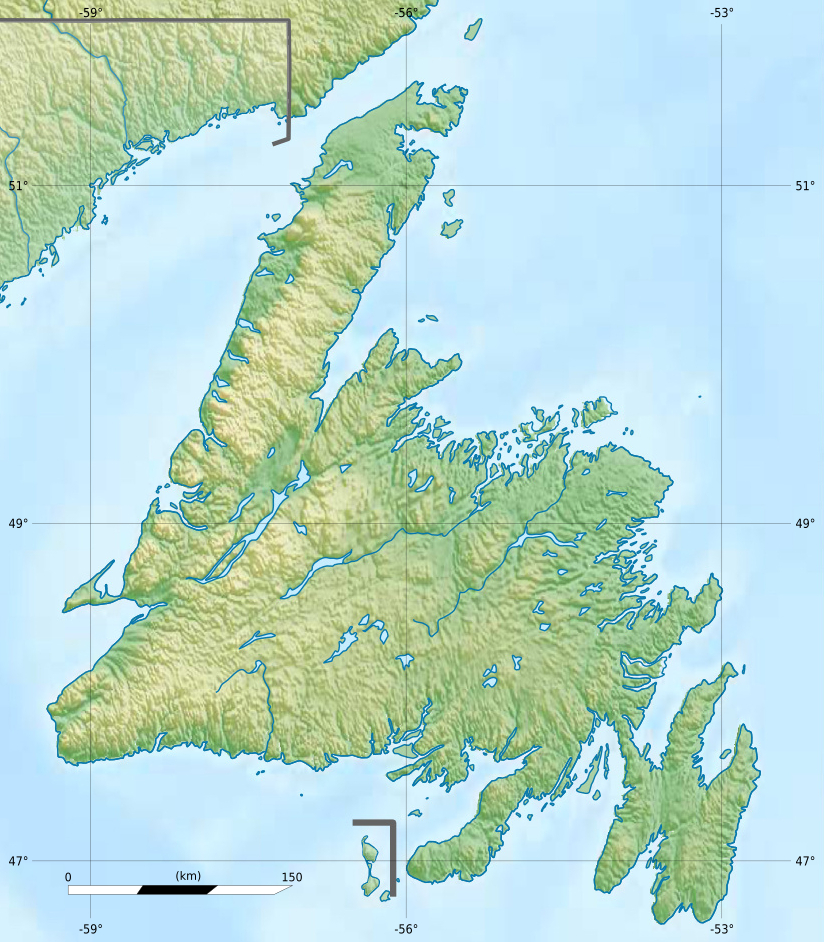
- Shown within Newfoundland

Location
- Country: Canada
- Province: Newfoundland and Labrador

Physical characteristics
- Mouth
  - coordinates: 48°52′18″N 57°55′06″W

Lady Slipper Brook is a stream in the Canadian province of Newfoundland and Labrador.
